Leonie Schwertmann (born ) is a German female volleyball player, playing as a middle-blocker. She is part of the Germany women's national volleyball team.

She competed at the 2015 European Games in Baku. At club level she played for USC Münster in 2015.
She participated in the 2016 FIVB Volleyball World Grand Prix.

References

External links
http://www.scoresway.com/?sport=volleyball&page=player&id=3296
https://www.uni-muenster.de/Spitzensport/sportler/alle/schwertmann.html
http://www.volleyball-verband.de/de/kader/nationalmannschaft--a-frauen-/spielerinnen--amp--trainer/leonie-schwertmann/

1994 births
Living people
German women's volleyball players
Place of birth missing (living people)
European Games competitors for Germany
Volleyball players at the 2015 European Games
21st-century German women
20th-century German women